Derek Farren (born June 2, 1970) is an Irish-American former professional tennis player.

Born to Irish parents in Chicago, Farren turned professional in 1991, after one year of collegiate tennis at Long Beach State. He had a best singles ranking of 399 while competing on the professional tour and was a quarter-finalist at the 1991 Christchurch Challenger. Through his parents he qualified to play Davis Cup for Ireland and featured in two ties, against Greece in 1992 and Ghana in 1993. His nephew, Connor Farren, is a professional tennis player.

See also
List of Ireland Davis Cup team representatives

References

External links
 
 
 

1970 births
Living people
Irish male tennis players
American people of Irish descent
Long Beach State Beach men's tennis players